420, 4:20 or 4/20 (pronounced four-twenty) is cannabis culture slang for marijuana and hashish consumption, especially smoking around the time 4:20 pm (16:20). It also refers to cannabis-oriented celebrations that take place annually on April 20 (4/20 in U.S. form). At locations in the United States where cannabis is legal, cannabis dispensaries will often offer discounts on their products on April 20.

Origins
In 1971, five high school students in San Rafael, California, used the term "4:20" in connection with a plan to search for an abandoned cannabis crop, based on a treasure map made by the grower. Calling themselves the Waldos, because their typical hang-out spot "was a wall outside the school", the five students—Steve Capper, Dave Reddix, Jeffrey Noel, Larry Schwartz, and Mark Gravich—designated the Louis Pasteur statue on the grounds of San Rafael High School as their meeting place, and 4:20 pm as their meeting time. The Waldos referred to this plan with the phrase "4:20 Louis". After several failed attempts to find the crop, the group eventually shortened their phrase to "4:20", which ultimately evolved into a code-word the teens used to refer to consuming cannabis.

Steven Hager of High Times popularized the story of the Waldos. The first High Times mention of 4:20 smoking and a 4/20 holiday appeared in May 1991 and erroneously attributed the origin of the term to a police code; this and other spurious incorrect origin stories became common. The connection to the Waldos appeared in December 1998. Hager attributed the early spread of the phrase to Grateful Dead followers—after "Waldo" Reddix became a roadie for the Grateful Dead's bassist, Phil Lesh—and called for 4:20 pm to be the socially accepted time of the day to consume cannabis.

International observance of April 20

April 20 has become an international counterculture holiday based on the celebration and consumption of cannabis. Events typically advocate for cannabis liberalization and legalization. Vivian McPeak, a founder of Seattle's Hempfest states that 4/20 is "half celebration and half call to action". Paul Birch calls it a global movement and suggests that one cannot stop events like these.

Many marijuana users protest in civil disobedience by gathering in public to smoke at 4:20 pm.

As marijuana continues to be decriminalized and legalized around the world, cannabis activist Steve DeAngelo notes that "even if our activist work were complete, 420 morphs from a statement of conscience to a celebration of acceptance, a celebration of victory, a celebration of our amazing connection with this plant" which "will always be worthy of celebration".

In North America
North American observances have been held at many locations, including:
New York City: Washington Square Park in Manhattan
Boston: Boston Common
San Francisco: "Hippie Hill" in Golden Gate Park near the Haight-Ashbury
Santa Cruz: Porter College meadows at the University of California, Santa Cruz
Washington, D.C.: National Mall, United States Capitol
Vancouver: The Vancouver Art Gallery and Sunset Beach between 2016 and 2019.
Montreal: the Mount Royal monument
Denver: Civic Center Park
Ottawa: Parliament Hill and Major's Hill Park
 Edmonton: The Alberta Legislature Building
Boulder: campus of the University of Colorado Boulder
Toronto: Nathan Phillips Square and Yonge-Dundas Square
Berkeley: campus of the University of California, Berkeley on the Memorial Glade north of the Doe Memorial Library.
Mexico City: Mexican Senate under the slogan Planton 420.
Ann Arbor: Hash Bash

In Australia 
Australian observances have been held at many locations, over many years, including:

"Who Are We Hurting?" – Sydney City: Martin Place, NSW (2019)
420 Picnic 2019 – Melbourne, VIC
"Who Are We Hurting?" – Sydney, NSW (2018)
"Who Are We Hurting?" – Sydney City: Kings Cross, NSW (2017)
Happy Birthday Weed Craze Collective- 2016 - Sydney, NSW
 420 Protest at Sydney Town Hall by Jesse Willesee - 2015

Elsewhere
Events have also been held in Hyde Park in London and Dunedin, New Zealand, at the University of Otago.

In Ljubljana, Slovenia, the University of Ljubljana's student organization has carried out several annual cannabis-themed protests that have contributed to the debate on cannabis status in Slovenia and the subsequent legislation proposals in 2018 by gathering responses from various political parties in Slovenia and ranking them accordingly.

In Northern Cyprus, known for strict drug laws and intolerance to cannabis consumption, the first 420 event was held in the capital city Lefkoşa in 2015. On April 20, 2017, a small group of protesters carried out an event near the parliament building and made a public statement, demanding the legalization of cannabis sale, consumption, and production with state regulations.

Other effects

Traffic safety

Despite two studies reporting a supposed increase in the risk of fatal motor vehicle crashes on April 20, further investigation and analysis found the evidence did not support such claims.

Stolen signs

In the US, signs bearing the number 420 have been frequently stolen. In Colorado, the Colorado Department of Transportation replaced the Mile Marker 420 sign on I-70 east of Denver with one reading 419.99 in an attempt to stop the thievery; however, the folklore of the 419.99 sign has caused it to be stolen, too, as well as becoming a tourist destination. As of August 2018, the sign was missing, presumed stolen. The Colorado DOT usually will not replace signs that are repeatedly taken, but began the practice of replacing further down the road after "69" mile marker signs were frequently stolen—these were replaced with "68.5 mile" ones. The Idaho Department of Transportation (ITD) replaced the mile marker 420 sign on U.S. Highway 95, just south of Coeur d'Alene, with mile marker 419.9. The Washington State Department of Transportation implemented similar measures, but only replaced one of the two 420 signs in the state, with the remaining one being subsequently stolen. According to The Washington Post, there are eleven 420 mile markers in the US, after three replacements and one stolen and not replaced. In Goodhue County, Minnesota, officials have changed "420 St" street signs to "42x St". The mile marker 420 sign on U.S. Route 89, the only 420 marker in the state of Utah, is frequently stolen.

Legislation and other government recognition
In 2003, California Senate Bill 420 was introduced to regulate medical marijuana use, in deliberate reference to the status of 420 in marijuana culture. An unsuccessful 2010 bill to legalize cannabis in Guam was called Bill 420. A North Dakota bill to legalize cannabis was HB 1420, introduced in January 2021.

The Marijuana Freedom and Opportunity Act (which if enacted would decriminalize and deschedule cannabis in the United States) was announced by Senator and Senate Minority Leader Chuck Schumer (D-New York) on April 20, 2018. On January 9, 2019, H.R. 420 was introduced into the 116th Congress by Representative Earl Blumenauer (D-Oregon), named the Regulate Marijuana Like Alcohol Act, which is designed to remove cannabis from the Controlled Substances Act and return regulation to the states.

The State of Colorado auctioned off several cannabis-themed personalized license plates in 2021, with the bidding to be closed on April 20 (4/20). The highest bid shortly before the auction closed was over $6,500 for "ISIT420".

Following the success of Washington, D.C.'s Initiative 71 to legalize cannabis in 2014, Mayor Muriel Bowser granted license plate number 420 to the campaign's leader, Adam Eidinger.

Literature
Several books about cannabis have "420" in the title, including the cannabis cookbooks The 420 Cannabis Cookbook, published by Simon & Schuster, and The 420 Gourmet published in 2016 by HarperCollins.

Elon Musk controversy
In 2018, Tesla CEO Elon Musk tweeted that he planned to take his company private at $420 a share. The price was widely considered to be a marijuana reference. A jury found him not liable in 2023 for misleading investors. Musk testified during the trial that any associations with cannabis were coincidental.

See also

 "420" (2009 Family Guy episode)
 Drug subculture
 Legality of cannabis by country
 List of multinational festivals and holidays

References

External links

 
 

April observances
Cannabis culture
Cannabis events
Counterculture
In-jokes
International observances
Internet memes
Unofficial observances